Brulion (meaning Rough Sketchbook in English) was a Polish language quarterly literary magazine published in Poland from 1986 to 1999.

History and profile
Brulion was established by a group led by Robert Tekieli in Kraków in 1986. The magazine, published quarterly, ceased publication in 1999.

Its editor in chief was also Robert Tekieli. Originally a quarterly of the alternative and semi-legal Polish culture, it became known for respecting no taboos and producing scandals since its ninth issue, thus becoming the voice of the underground, anti-communist Poland. The generation of brulion writers was influenced mainly by American poets like Frank O'Hara (that is why they're often called o´harists), Allen Ginsberg or John Ashbery, translated by Pietr Sommer. Another translator, Stanisław Barańczak, introduced to Poland the poetry of Philip Larkin, W. H. Auden, Robert Frost and others. Brulion published among others an almanac named Przyszli barbarzyńci (Future barbarians; the title comes from a poem by Cavafy). Therefore, the brulion generation is also known as barbarians.

The best known brulion authors
 Marcin Baran
 Miłosz Biedrzycki
 Marzena Broda
 Paweł Filas
 Natasza Goerke
 Manuela Gretkowska
 Krzysztof Jaworski
 Krzysztof Koehler
 Cezary Michalski
 Jacek Podsiadło
 Marcin Sendecki
 Mirosław Spychalski
 Marcin Świetlicki
 Olga Tokarczuk
 Grzegorz Wróblewski

References

Bílé propasti (White Abysses), Host, Brno, 1997, p. 181-9.

1986 establishments in Poland
1999 disestablishments in Poland
Defunct literary magazines published in Poland
Magazines established in 1986
Magazines disestablished in 1999
Mass media in Kraków
Polish-language magazines
Quarterly magazines